Gianfranco Foresti (born 18 June 1950) is an Italian racing cyclist. He rode in the 1979 Tour de France.

References

External links
 

1950 births
Living people
Italian male cyclists
Place of birth missing (living people)
Cyclists from the Province of Bergamo